Kimi Goetz (born August 13, 1994) is an American speed skater who represented the United States at the 2022 Winter Olympics.

Early life
Raised in Flemington, New Jersey, Goetz got into roller skating as a child. She graduated from Hunterdon Central Regional High School in 2012 and headed out to Salt Lake City, where she saw other inline skaters who had made the transition to speed skating on ice.

Career
During the first day of the 2018 U.S. Olympic Trials, Goetz fell and hit her head and suffered a concussion after a skate technician at the event failed to bolt her blade into her boot properly. As a result, she failed to make the Olympic team. During the summer of 2018, she switched from short track speed skating to long track speed skating. She represented the United States at the 2022 Winter Olympics.

At the 2022–23 ISU Speed Skating World Cup Goetz won five medals, including her first gold medal in the 1,000 meter event on February 12, 2023 in Poland. She ended the season ranked among the top five in both the 500 and 1,000 metres. She also won the World Cup season title in the women's team sprint along with McKenzie Browne and Erin Jackson.

Personal life
Goetz's boyfriend is Olympic speed skater Mitchell Whitmore.

References

External links

1994 births
Living people
American female speed skaters
Hunterdon Central Regional High School alumni
People from Flemington, New Jersey
Speed skaters at the 2022 Winter Olympics
Sportspeople from Hunterdon County, New Jersey
Olympic speed skaters of the United States
World Single Distances Speed Skating Championships medalists
21st-century American women